Legionella sainthelensi is a Gram-negative, catalase- and oxidase-positive,  non-spore-forming, motile bacterium from the genus Legionella which was isolated from fresh water in regions influenced by the volcanic eruptions of Mount St. Helens in Washington. L. sainthelensi can cause infection in the respiratory tract.

References

External links
Type strain of Legionella sainthelensi at BacDive -  the Bacterial Diversity Metadatabase

Legionellales
Bacteria described in 1984